Léonard Nuytens (born 7 September 1892, date of death unknown) was a Belgian coxswain. He competed at the 1912 Summer Olympics in Stockholm with the men's coxed four where they were eliminated in the quarter finals.

References

1892 births
Year of death missing
Belgian male rowers
Olympic rowers of Belgium
Rowers at the 1912 Summer Olympics
Rowers from Ghent
Coxswains (rowing)
European Rowing Championships medalists
20th-century Belgian people